Borbo borbonica, the borbo skipper, Zeller's skipper or olive haired swift, is a butterfly of the family Hesperiidae. It is found along the southern coasts of the Mediterranean Sea, but mainly in Syria, Arabia, Africa, Mauritius and Réunion.

The length of the forewings is 14–15 mm. Adults are on wing from September to October.

In North Africa Leersia oryzoides and Sorghum halepense have been recorded as food plants for the larvae. In Mauritius, they feed on various grasses, such as Panicum. In South-Africa, larvae have been recorded on Ehrharta erecta, Oryza, Pennisetum and Zea mays.

Subspecies
Borbo borbonica borbonica (Gibraltar, North Africa, Middle East, Sub-Saharan Africa, including Mauritania, Senegal Gambia, Guinea, Sierra Leone, Liberia, Ivory Coast, Ghana, Togo, northern Nigeria, Zambia, Mozambique, Zimbabwe, northern Botswana, northern Namibia, South Africa, Eswatini, Madagascar, Reunion, Rodrigues, Mauritius)
Borbo borbonica morella (de Joannis, 1893) (Seychelles)

References

Hesperiinae